Xhindi is a mythological creature in Albanian mythology.

Appearance
Xhindis are usually depicted as invisible spirits, somewhat analogues to elves in Albanian folklore. Their arrival is signaled by the creaking of doors and flickering of lights. Their intentions may be benevolent or malevolent thus they are sometimes represented as kind and helpful while sometimes they appear as oppressive.

See also
 Kulshedra
 Perria
 Stihi

References

Albanian legendary creatures
Albanian folklore
Jinn